Kurugodu  is a town in the southern state of Karnataka, India. It is headquarters of Kurugodu taluk in Bellary district of Karnataka. The Sri Dodda Basaveshwara Temple (Big Basava) is located here. Every year Ratha Mahothsava of the Swamy Dodda Basaveshwara held on holy Poornima.

Demographics 

 India census, Kurugodu had a population of 17,379 with 8,815 males and 8,564 females.

Geography
 Bellary
 Districts of Karnataka

References

External links
 http://Bellary.nic.in/

Villages in Bellary district